Barb (SSN-804) will be a Block 5  with third United States Navy vessel named for the barb fish. She will also be the first Virginia-class submarine to be named after an aquatic animal and the first US Navy submarine to be named after an aquatic animal in more than 30 years. Secretary of the Navy Kenneth Braithwaite officially announced the name on 13 October 2020, in a ceremony unveiling plans to construct a new National Museum of the United States Navy in Washington, D.C. The change in naming convention is in reference to the World War II era submarine , which achieved one of the most outstanding combat records in US Navy history, specifically under the command of Commander Eugene B. Fluckey who was awarded the Medal of Honor while Barb received the Presidential Unit Citation.

References

Virginia-class submarines
Submarines of the United States Navy
Proposed ships of the United States Navy